The 2018–19 Liga Națională season is the 69th season of the Liga Națională, the highest professional basketball league in Romania. Sepsi SIC is the defending champion.

Competition format
The Romanian Basketball Federation agreed a change in the competition format for the 2018–19 season:

 13 teams (divided into 2 value groups: A and B) played the regular season, consisting in a double-legged round robin format.
 Group A consist of the top 6 ranked teams from the 2017–18 Liga Națională.
 Group B consist of the 9th place from the 2017–18 Liga Națională and top 6 ranked teams from the 2017–18 Liga I.
 At the end of the regular season, teams are split into four groups (Red, Yellow, Blue and Green).
 Red Group consist of the Group A teams and the winner of the Group B.
 Yellow Group consist of the other teams from Group B, ranked 2–7.
 All teams from the Red Group (from 1st to 7th place) and the winner of the Yellow Group will join the play-offs. In this knockout stage, quarterfinals and semifinals will be played with a best-of-five-games format.
 To decide the teams ranked between 5th and 8th place will be used the best-of-three-games format.
 The rest of the teams from the Yellow, Blue and Green Groups (16 teams) will form 2 groups of 8 teams and will play to decide the final rankings.
 Liga I was dissolved, so no team will relegate.

Team changes 

Promoted from Liga I
 CSM Târgoviște
 Phoenix Constanța
 U CSM Oradea
 Rapid București
 Agronomia București
 KSE Târgu Secuiesc

Relegated to Liga I
 —

Excluded teams
SCM Timișoara withdrew due to financial problems.

CSU Alba Iulia withdrew due to organizational problems.

Renamed teams
BC Sirius was moved to the sports club of Municipality of Târgu Mureș and was renamed as CSM Târgu Mureș.

CSBT Alexandria was moved to the sports club of Municipality of Alexandria and was renamed as CSM Alexandria.

Teams

Group A

Group B

Regular season

Group A

Results

Group B

Results

Second stage

Red Group

Results

Yellow Group

Results

Play-offs
All series were played in a best-of-five games format, excluding the third place match.

Bracket

5th to 8th
All series were played in a best-of-three games format.

9th to 13th

Final rankings

References

External links
Official site of the Romanian Basketball Federation
Halfcourt.info (Romanian and English)
Numaibaschet.ro (Romanian)
Baschetromania.ro (Romanian)

2018-19
Romanian
Lea